Kendriya Vidyalaya No.1 Kanchrapara is a government school that offers both primary and secondary education in Kanchrapara, North 24 Parganas, West Bengal, India. It is under the group of the schools known as the Kendriya Vidyalayas under the aegis of Ministry of Human Resource Development.

History 
Kendriya Vidyalaya No.1 Kanchrapara (also called K.V. No.1 Kanchrapara) commenced from the year 1978 inside the Kampa Defence Sector. A new primary block (Class I – V) was opened in January 2012.

Education system 
This school is affiliated to Central Board of Secondary Education(CBSE). The medium of teaching is English.

The school also teaches Hindi, Sanskrit and German languages.

The school has Classes I-V  in "Primary Block" and Classes VI-XII in "Secondary Block".

The school offers three streams at 10+2 level:-- Humanities, Science (Computer Sciences / Biological Sciences) and Commerce.

Campus 
When the school commenced from the year 1978, the school building was an old model (only ground-floor) and was taken from the Army sector. Then, each class had three sections(A to C).

The school built its own building and was inaugurated by Mr. H M Cairae, IAS, Commissioner, KVS, New Delhi in presence of Col. Surinder Sharma, Station Commander and Chairman, Vidyalaya Management Committee (VMC) on 17th Nov. 2000. Each class has four sections(A to D) from classes I to X and three sections(A to C) for classes XI and XII in this building. The classes I to X are divided into sections to lower the teacher-student ratio, to make teaching more efficient. The classes XI and XII were divided into sections A, B and C based on 10+2 level.

From 2014, one more section was added to classes XI and XII. Now classes XI and XII have sections A to D.
 Section A: Computer sciences
 Section B: Biological sciences
 Section C: Commerce
 Section D: Humanities
In January 2012, the school opened a new building for Primary Block(Class I - V) in the same campus, each class having four sections(A to D).

The school has e-rooms, computer aided teaching for better learning of students. The primary and secondary blocks are monitored by CCTV cameras. Speakers are installed at corridors for emergency announcements.

The school has its own football, cricket, basketball and kho-kho ground. The equipment for the mentioned games as well as hockey, badminton, tennis (with table-tennis table), volleyball, chess, and other indoor games are available.

Academic session 
The academic session starts from 1 April and ends on 31 March of every financial year.

See also 
 List of Kendriya Vidyalayas
 NCERT

References 

Kendriya Vidyalayas
Primary schools in West Bengal
High schools and secondary schools in West Bengal
Schools in North 24 Parganas district
Educational institutions established in 1964
1964 establishments in West Bengal